"The Reason" is a song by Canadian singer Celine Dion, recorded for her fifth English-language studio album, Let's Talk About Love (1997). It was written by Carole King, Mark Hudson and Greg Wells, and produced by Sir George Martin. "The Reason" was released as the second single from the album in selected European countries on 24 November 1997. In France, it was issued as a double A-side single with "My Heart Will Go On".

Background and release
Carole King wrote this song first for the band Aerosmith. 

Dion performed "The Reason" during her Let's Talk About Love Tour, and as a duet with Carole King on VH1 Divas and at the 48° Festival di Sanremo on 1998 in Italy. On that occasion she also performed "My Heart Will Go On".

The track was included later on The Collector's Series, Volume One in 2000 and My Love: Ultimate Essential Collection European edition in 2008.

The recording of this song was included as a bonus on the Au cœur du stade DVD.

From 2011–2014, "The Reason" was included in the set list of Dion's Las Vegas show, Celine. The song was also performed in Dion's 2017 tour and 2018 tour. "The Reason" was performed by Dion during her BST Hyde Park concert in London on 5 July 2019. The song was also performed during the first two US shows of Dion's Courage World Tour in 2019.

Carole King recorded also her own version of this song for her 2001 album Love Makes the World, this time with Dion on backing vocals.

Critical reception
Pip Ellwood-Hughes from Entertainment Focus noted that the song "immediately reminds you of why Dion has become such a powerhouse." He added that "it highlights how she can pack power and emotion into everything she sings." British magazine Music Week gave it three out of five, stating that "Celine is back in classic power ballad territory here, though this track lacks the mega hooks of her previous hits. More of an album taster than a Christmas number one." The New York Observer editor Jonathan Bernstein reviewed, "It kicks off in time-honored fashion with a bombastic power ballad, "The Reason," co-written by Carole King and produced by Sir George Martin. Thus, straight away, we find the inherent wrongheadedness of this record. Carole King hasn't written a memorable song in many a year and-hello?-didn't George Martin recently announce that he was quitting the producing racket because his hearing was going? The latter affliction was probably incurred by a silent prayer offered up during the recording of "The Reason" to be struck deaf". Bob Waliszewski of Plugged In felt that it celebrate's love "and the affection of a good man". Christopher Smith from TalkAboutPopMusic declared the song as "a typical Celine mid-tempo ballad with plenty of high notes for Celine to hit and re-establish her presence."

Music video
The accompanying music video for "The Reason" was directed by Scott Lochmus and released in December 1997. It was showing the recording of the song in the studio.

Formats and track listings

 European CD single
"The Reason" – 5:01
"Be the Man" – 4:39

 French CD single (double A-side)
"The Reason" – 5:01
"My Heart Will Go On" – 4:40

 UK cssette single
"The Reason" – 5:01
"Be the Man" – 4:39
"The Christmas Song" – 4:12

 European/UK CD maxi-single and French 12" single
"The Reason" – 5:01
"Be the Man" – 4:39
"Make You Happy" – 4:31
"With this Tear" – 4:12

 UK CD maxi-single #2 
"The Reason" – 5:01
"Cherche encore" – 3:24
"Lovin' Proof" – 4:09
"The Christmas Song" – 4:12

 European/UK promo single
"The Reason" (Radio Edit) – 4:30

Charts

Weekly charts

Year-end charts

Certifications and sales

Release history

See also
French Top 100 singles of the 1990s
List of number-one singles of 1998 (France)

Notes
A  Released as a double A-side with "My Heart Will Go On".

References

External links

1997 singles
1997 songs
1990s ballads
Celine Dion songs
Columbia Records singles
Epic Records singles
Pop ballads
Song recordings produced by George Martin
Songs written by Carole King
Songs written by Greg Wells
Songs written by Mark Hudson (musician)